Foster City is a city located in San Mateo County, California. The 2020 census put the population at 33,805, an increase of more than 10% over the 2010 census figure of 30,567. Foster City is sometimes considered to be part of Silicon Valley for its local industry and its proximity to Silicon Valley cities. Foster City is one of the United States’ safest cities, with an average of one murder per decade.

History

Foster City was founded in the 1960s, built on the existing Brewer Island in the marshes of the San Francisco Bay on the east edge of San Mateo, enlarged with engineered landfill. The city was named after T. Jack Foster, a real estate magnate who owned much of the land comprising the city and who was instrumental in its initial design. His firm, Foster Enterprises, now run by his descendants, relocated to San Mateo in 2000 and is still active in real estate affairs throughout the San Francisco Bay Area.

Geography
The total area is 81.07% water. Foster City has ongoing issues with water intrusion from the San Francisco Bay and is potentially subject to permanent inundation as the sea level rises. A project to improve the existing levee with a steel-reinforced wall has been underway since FEMA designated the entire area as a floodplain making residents subject to much higher flood insurance rates.

Climate
Foster City, like most of the peninsula, has a mild Mediterranean climate, with warm, dry summers and cool, wet winters.

Demographics

2020
The 2020 United States Census reported that Foster City had a population of 33,056 with 12,243 households. The 2020 median home price in Foster City was $1,439,375. The population density was 8,947.22/sq mi (3,454.27/km2). The racial makeup of Foster City was 13,171 (39.8%) White, 818 (2.5%) African American, 39 (0.1%) Native American, 16,715(50.6%) Asian, 30 (0.1%) Pacific Islander, 394 (1.2%) from other races, and 1,889 (5.7%) from two or more races. Hispanic or Latino of any race were 2,605 persons (7.9%).  52% of the population was born in the United States, and 22% of the population are naturalized citizens.  

The Census reported that the median household income was $163,322, 3.2% of the population was below the poverty line, out of the total population 2.5% of those under the age of 18 and 5.1% of those 65 and older were living below the poverty line. 

For those over the age of 25, 96% had a High School Diploma or higher, 71% had a Bachelor's Degree, and 36.6% had a Graduate Degree or Professional Degree.

2010
The 2010 United States Census reported that Foster City had a population of 30,567. The 2009 median home price in Foster City was $1,025,000. The racial makeup of Foster City was 13,912 (45.5%) White, 576 (1.9%) African American, 29 (0.1%) Native American, 13,746 (45.0%) Asian, 189 (0.6%) Pacific Islander, 575 (1.9%) from other races, and 1,540 (5.0%) from two or more races. Hispanic or Latino of any race were 1,995 persons (6.5%).

The Census reported that 30,458 people (99.6% of the population) lived in households, 52 (0.2%) lived in non-institutionalized group quarters, and 57 (0.2%) were institutionalized.

There were 12,016 households, out of which 4,256 (35.4%) had children under the age of 18 living in them, 7,127 (59.3%) were opposite-sex married couples living together, 963 (8.0%) had a female householder with no husband present, 316 (2.6%) had a male householder with no wife present. There were 531 (4.4%) unmarried opposite-sex partnerships, and 75 (0.6%) same-sex married couples or partnerships. 2,807 households (23.4%) were made up of individuals, and 860 (7.2%) had someone living alone who was 65 years of age or older. The average household size was 2.53. There were 8,406 families (70.0% of all households); the average family size was 3.04.

The population was spread out, with 6,913 people (22.6%) under the age of 18, 1,526 people (5.0%) aged 18 to 24, 9,801 people (32.1%) aged 25 to 44, 8,223 people (26.9%) aged 45 to 64, and 4,104 people (13.4%) who were 65 years of age or older. The median age was 39.3 years. For every 100 females, there were 93.5 males. For every 100 females age 18 and over, there were 91.0 males.

The homeowner vacancy rate was 0.8%; the rental vacancy rate was 3.5%. 18,423 people (60.3% of the population) lived in owner-occupied housing units and 12,035 people (39.4%) lived in rental housing units.

2000
As of the census of 2000, there were 28,803 people, 11,613 households, and 7,931 families residing in the city. There were 11,613 households, out of which 30.5% had children under the age of 18 living with them, 57.7% were married couples living together, 7.7% had a female householder with no husband present, and 31.7% were non-families. 23.6% of all households were made up of individuals, and 5.0% had someone living alone who was 65 years of age or older. The average household size was 2.47 and the average family size was 2.97.

In the city, the population was spread out, with 21.2% under the age of 18, 5.9% from 18 to 24, 35.3% from 25 to 44, 27.6% from 45 to 64, and 10.1% who were 65 years of age or older. The median age was 38 years. For every 100 females, there were 96.8 males. For every 100 females age 18 and over, there were 93.9 males.

According to Money magazine, the median income for a household in Foster City was $135,470. The median income for a family was $118,231. Males had a median income of $77,916 versus $51,157 for females. The per capita income for the city was $45,754. 2.9% of the population and 1.7% of families were below the poverty line. Out of the total population, 1.6% of those under the age of 18 and 5.6% of those 65 and older were living below the poverty line.

Economy

Headquarters

Around 1993 Visa Inc. began consolidating various scattered offices in San Mateo, California to a location in Foster City. Visa's headquarters were in Foster City, and Visa became Foster City's largest employer. Visa owns four buildings at the intersection of Metro Center Boulevard and Vintage Park Drive. As of 2009 it employed about 3,000 people at the complex. During that year Visa signed a 10-year lease agreement for the top three floors of 595 Market Street in San Francisco and moved its top executives there. Visa continued to keep employees at the Foster City offices. As of 2009, after the headquarters move, the Foster City facilities remained the company's center of employment, and those buildings housed 2,400 employees as of 2009.

Other companies with headquarters in Foster City:

 Applied Underwriters
 Conversica
 Conviva
 Electronics for Imaging
 Gilead Sciences
 Guidewire Software
 Imperva, Inc.
 Live365.com
 LiveRamp
 Navigenics
 Philips (manufacturing facility)
 QuinStreet Inc.
 Sledgehammer Games
 Sling Media
 Truviso
 Zuora
 Zoox

Top employers

According to the city's 2021 Comprehensive Annual Financial Report, the top employers in the city are:

Arts and culture
The city is served by the Peninsula Library System.

Parks and recreation

Foster City also has:
World Class Windsurfing and Kite-Surfing A world-class windsurfing and kite-surfing spot in the San Francisco Bay can be found within the city limits of Foster City. It is located adjacent to Mariners Point.
 A Golf course and driving range There is one 9-hole golf course, and driving range Mariners' Point, on land owned by the city, and operated by VB Golf.
 Dragon Boating The Bay Area Dragons and Ho'okahi Pu'uwai Outrigger Canoe clubs operate in the lagoon. In an attempt to preserve the city's waterways and reduce noise levels, only electric, wind, or man-powered watercraft are permitted in the Lagoon.
 Teen Activities Center A newly constructed $4 million center for teens that will provide access to: TV's, computers, video games, art rooms, homework rooms, a kitchen and outdoor basketball courts. The center is also known as "The Vibe" and has a concrete skatepark adjacent to it.
 Public Amphitheatre Located in Leo J. Ryan Memorial Park, is a newly constructed Amphitheatre. It serves as the location for the Foster City Summer concerts. Adjacent to the park is a boardwalk with boat tie-up facilities.
 Community Theatre The historic Hillbarn Theatre was founded in 1941 and provides the community with a robust calendar of events as well as performance classes.

In addition, Foster City maintains an extensive , man-made enclosed lagoon system. The lagoons were initially designed as a drainage system required in order to efficiently drain the lowland city.

Government

, Foster City's Mayor is Richa Awasthi. Other councilmembers include Sam Hindi, Jon Froomin, and Patrick Sullivan. Froomin was elected to office after former councilmember Herb Perez was recalled by a majority of Foster City voters. Perez was the first city councilperson to be recalled since 1977.

Former Mayor Sam Hindi was the first Palestinian-American Mayor in the history of California.
Councilmember Sanjay Gehani was the first Mayor for Foster City of Indian descent. Current (2022) Mayor Richa Awashi is the first female minority Mayor and first woman Immigrant to be Foster City's Mayor.

According to the California Secretary of State, as of February 10, 2019, Foster City has 16,568 registered voters. Of those, 7,336 (44.3%) are registered Democrats, 2,756 (16.6%) are registered Republicans, and 5,977 (36.1%) have declined to state a political party.

Education

Foster City is home to five public schools in the San Mateo-Foster City Elementary School District. Foster City Elementary School (which has recently been remodeled), Brewer Island Elementary School, Audubon Elementary School, and newly-built Beach Park Elementary School serve kindergarten through fifth grades. Nathaniel Bowditch Middle School serves 6th through 8th grades. There are several private preschools and elementary schools. There is a separate High School District: San Mateo Union High School District. There is no high school located east of Highway 101 so Foster City high school students attend the public schools in the San Mateo Union High School District and other private high schools in the San Francisco Bay Area.

Four public schools in Foster City (Audubon School, Brewer Island School, Foster City School, and Bowditch Middle School) have won California Distinguished School awards. In 1993, Bowditch was recognized with the U.S. Department of Education Blue Ribbon. In 2005, Bowditch became a California Distinguished School for the second time. A third recognition was given in 2013.

Foster City has one private Jewish day school: Ronald C. Wornick Jewish Day School is a kindergarten – eighth grade school. It was rated the number one Jewish day school in the South Bay/Peninsula.

Foster City also has one private elementary school: Kids Connection is a kindergarten – fifth grade school.

Items of interest
Foster City's Werder Pier is a remainder of the original expanse of the San Mateo–Hayward Bridge. It is also one of the longest and oldest piers in California. Unfortunately, due to much needed repair, the once popular fishing pier is no longer in operation.

A number of San Francisco professional athletes have called Foster City home. Former San Francisco Giants players Kevin Mitchell and Jeff Kent won the National League Most Valuable Player award while they were residents of Foster City.

Peter Thiel, founder of PayPal, was raised in Foster City.

Norman Hsu, the Hong Kong-born convicted criminal (Ponzi scheme scam artist) and political activist, is a former resident of Foster City.

The movie Over the Edge is based on events occurring in Foster City and chronicled in a 1973 article titled "Mousepacks: Kids on a Crime Spree" in the San Francisco Examiner.

Foster City TV broadcasts a variety of programs related to the operation of and life in Foster City. Foster City TV provides programming through a dedicated government-access television (GATV) channel.

See also

Foster City Marina
Leo J. Ryan Memorial Park

References

External links

 
1971 establishments in California
Cities in San Mateo County, California
Cities in the San Francisco Bay Area
Incorporated cities and towns in California
Planned cities in the United States
Populated places established in 1971
Populated coastal places in California